The Serbian Hockey League Season for 2008-2009 consisted of 16 games. HK Partizan won the regular division and the playoffs, making it their 4th title in a row.

Final standings

Playoffs

Semifinals
HK Vojvodina vs HK Novi Sad
Game 1 - HK Vojvodina - HK Novi Sad 7-4 (1-0, 4-2, 2-2)
Game 2 - HK Novi Sad - HK Vojvodina 4-0 (1-0, 2-0, 1-0)
Game 3 - HK Vojvodina - HK Novi Sad 9-1 (4-0, 2-1, 3-0)
Vojvodina wins 2-1

HK Partizan vs Crvena Zvezda
Zvezda forfeits, Partizan wins 2-0

Finals
Game 1 - HK Partizan - HK Vojvodina 3-6 (0-1, 1-2, 2-3)
Game 2 - HK Vojvodina - HK Partizan 0-4 (0-0, 0-2, 0-2)
Game 3 - HK Partizan - HK Vojvodina 3-2 SO (0-1, 1-1, 1-0, 0-0, 1-0)
HK Partizan wins the series 2:1

External links
 

Serbian Hockey League
Serbian Hockey League seasons
Serb